In professional wrestling, TNT is a tag team consisting of twin brothers Terrell Hughes and Terrence Hughes (born February 25, 1995), the sons of Impact and WWE Hall of Famer Devon "D-Von Dudley" Hughes.

Early lives 
Terrell and Terrence competed in amateur wrestling during high school. In 2011, they appeared alongside their father Devon in Total Nonstop Action Wrestling (TNA) during his feud with Bully Ray, with Bully Ray repeatedly heckling them as they sat in the audience. They were subsequently involved in the feud between their father and D'Angelo Dinero, with the angle seeing them abandon their father in favour of Dinero. The angle came to a conclusion at Genesis in January 2012, where they reunited with their father, helping him defeat Dinero.

Professional wrestling career 
Terrell and Terrence Hughes trained as professional wrestlers under their father at the Team 3D Academy. They debuted in 2015 under their birth names, forming a tag team together named "TNT". They spent the next five years wrestling on the independent circuit in Florida, calling themselves "Terrell Dudley" and "Terrence Dudley" for a period in 2016 and 2017. In June 2018, they took part in a try-out with WWE at the WWE Performance Center. In September 2020, they appeared on the WWE television show SmackDown, portraying security guards. In November 2020, they began making sporadic appearances with the Jacksonville, Florida-based promotion All Elite Wrestling (AEW). In October 2022, their father confirmed that they had finished making appearances with AEW.

Professional wrestling style and persona 
TNT use the 3D as their finishing move; they adopted the move from their father's tag team The Dudley Boyz.

Personal lives 
Terrell and Terrence Hughes are the sons of professional wrestler Devon Hughes. They are fraternal twins.

Championships and accomplishments 
Atomic Wrestling Entertainment
AWE Tag Team Championship (1 time)
Conquer Pro Wrestling
CPW Tag Team Championship (1 time)
Destiny Christian Championship Wrestling
DCCW Tag Team Championship (1 time)
United States Wrestling Alliance
USWA Tag Team Titles (2 times)

References

External links 
 
 
 
 
 

Living people
All Elite Wrestling teams and stables
American male professional wrestlers
Independent promotions teams and stables
People from New Rochelle, New York
Professional wrestlers from New York (state)
Sibling duos
American twins
Year of birth missing (living people)